Cirrhicera niveosignata is a species of beetle in the family Cerambycidae. It was described by Thomson in 1860. It is known from Mexico.

References

Hemilophini
Beetles described in 1860